The 2008 Oceania Handball Championship was the sixth edition of the Oceania Handball Nations Cup, which took place in Wellington, New Zealand from 7 to 10 April 2008. Entered nations were Australia, Cook Islands, New Caledonia and New Zealand. Although New Caledonia won the tournament, they are ineligible to go to the 2009 World Men's Handball Championship as they are a French colony. Australia won the right to represent Oceania by coming second.

Table

Results
All times are local (UTC+12).

References

External links
Report on Tudor Handball

Oceania men championship
Oceania Handball Championship
International handball competitions hosted by New Zealand
2008 in New Zealand sport
April 2008 sports events in New Zealand